Upsilon Orionis (υ Ori, υ Orionis) is a star in the constellation Orion. It has the traditional name Thabit  or Tabit (ﺛﺎﺑﺖ, Arabic for "the endurer"), a name shared with pi3 Orionis. It is a blue-white main sequence star of apparent magnitude 4.62 located over 3000 light-years distant from the Solar System. It is a suspected Beta Cephei variable.

Name
Located south of Iota Orionis, Upsilon Orionis is one of two stars (the other is 29 Orionis) marking the top of Orion's right boot in Johann Bayer's Uranometria (1603). It was given the number 36 by John Flamsteed, while its proper name appears to be derived from the Arabic Al Thabit "the endurer". In his Star-Names and Their Meanings (1899), American amateur naturalist Richard Hinckley Allen noted that the name appeared on the star atlas Geography of the Heavens, composed by Elijah Hinsdale Burritt, but its ultimate origin was unknown.

Properties
Since 1943, this star has been consistently defined as a B0 main sequence star used as a reference for classifying the spectra of other stars on the MK scale, although in other studies it has been classified as O9V and O9.5V. The Galactic O-Star Spectroscopic Survey has defined it as the standard star for the O9.7 V spectral type.

In a 1981 paper, υ Orionis was observed to have nonradial pulsations over a period of around 12 hours, and has been classified as a slowly pulsating B star. Subsequent review of Hipparcos catalog data indicated it was most likely a Beta Cephei variable, and is hence considered a candidate for that class. These are blue-white main sequence stars of around 10 to 20 times the mass of the Sun that pulsate with periods of 0.1 to 0.3 days; their changes in magnitude are much more pronounced in the ultraviolet than in the visual spectrum. It is classified as a Beta Cephei variable by the American Association of Variable Star Observers, and has an apparent magnitude of +4.62.

A 1979 review of photometry of O and B stars found it to be around 1666 light-years distant, with a radius 7.5 times and luminosity 44,000 times that of the Sun, and surface temperature of 33,000 K. and a mass 16.6 times that of the Sun. It is one of the most massive stars of the Orion OB1c association (in Orion's Sword).

References

Orion (constellation)
Orionis, Upsilon
Thabit
Beta Cephei variables
Orionis, 36
025923
O-type main-sequence stars
1855
036512
Durchmusterung objects